Blue Tears is the debut album of the band of the same name. The album was released in 1990 by MCA Records. It spawned several singles and videos like "Innocent Kiss" and "Rockin' with the Radio". "Rockin' with the Radio" peaked at #45 in "Aor Tracks" chart by Radio & Records and its video received medium airplay on MTV.

Track listing
All songs written by Gregg Fulkerson, except where noted.
 "Rockin' With the Radio" - 4:23 
 "Crush" (Fulkerson, Kevin Savigar) - 4:12
 "Blue Tears" - 5:18
 "Take This Heart" (Fulkerson, Ron Hutcheson) - 4:27
 "Halfway to Heaven" - 3:56
 "Innocent Kiss" - 3:23
 "Racing With the Moon" - 3:29
 "Kiss Me Goodbye" - 4:45
 "True Romance" - 5:03
 "Thunder in the Night" (Fulkerson, Savigar) - 5:01

Personnel
 Gregg Fulkerson - vocals, guitar
 Charlie Lauderdale - drums
 Bryan Hall - guitar, vocals
 Michael Spears - bass

References

1990 debut albums
Blue Tears albums
MCA Records albums